Vassilis Fragkias (alternative spellings: Vasilis, Fragias; born 24 August 1961) is a Greek former basketball player and professional basketball coach.

Playing career
Fragkias played club basketball with the Greek club Zografou.

Coaching career
During his coaching career, Fragkias has been the head coach of numerous professional teams in Greece, Cyprus, and the Ukraine.

In 2014, Fragkias became the head coach of the senior Qatari national basketball team. He led Qatar to the quarterfinals of the 2015 FIBA Asia Championship.

References

External links
Eurobasket.com Profile
Diamond Sports Agency Profile
Aspire Sports Management Profile

1961 births
Living people
AEL Limassol B.C. coaches
Basketball coaches
BC Dnipro-Azot coaches
Dafni B.C. coaches
Greek basketball coaches
Greek men's basketball players
Ilysiakos B.C. coaches
Keravnos B.C. coaches
Kolossos Rodou B.C. coaches
Larisa B.C. coaches
Olympia Larissa B.C. coaches
Pagrati B.C. coaches
Panionios B.C. coaches
Peristeri B.C. coaches
Sporting B.C. coaches
Basketball players from Athens